Caroline Freeman College is a residential college owned and operated by the University of Otago in Dunedin, New Zealand. The college is located a short distance north of the Otago central campus near the Dunedin Botanical Gardens.

History and Design
The Dunedin City Tertiary Accommodation Trust established what was City College in the year 2000 to provide accommodation for students from the University of Otago, Otago Polytechnic and the Dunedin College of Education (now University of Otago College of Education). The college was built to resemble a traditional English-style residential college with gardens, courtyards, arched entryways and covered walkways.  The residential apartments surround the central common areas of the complex. These common areas include student lounges, dining room, art/music room, study areas and a library.  The college has extensive garden and courtyard spaces. It is the only fully-catered Otago college based around apartment groups, having 214 rooms spread around 38 four-, five- and six-bedroom apartments.

The college “houses”, Hepburn, Sandland, McKenzie, Ford, McIvor, Mitchell and Dawson, are named after the owners of the Original Crown Land Grants of Block 34 North Dunedin in 1858.

At the start of 2018, college ownership transferred entirely to the University of Otago, and the college was renamed (from City College to Caroline Freeman College), to honour Caroline Freeman, the University of Otago's first female graduate. Since the start of 2018 the college has been a  residential collegiate community for predominantly first-year students of the University of Otago.

In late 2020, Caroline Freeman College assumed oversight of Abbey College, an Otago-owned residential college for post-graduate students.  The Abbey College site is located directly across Cumberland Street from Caroline Freeman College. The Abbey site was refurbished, repurposed and renamed Caroline Freeman College - East.  The original Abbey College buildings were all renamed to reflect the flora and fauna of the site - Rata, Kowhai, Tui and Kereru.  CFC East provides accommodation for 85 residents bringing the total resident population to 299.  CFC East has a variety of room types including two and three-bedroom "pods", single en-suite and shared en-suite rooms.  Extensive common space, lounge and dining areas and outdoor areas are all part of the East campus.

Present Day

Caroline Freeman College is notable for its diverse student population with residents from over 125 different secondary schools from throughout New Zealand and overseas. The residents study a broad range of subjects at the University of Otago. The college has a management structure consisting of the Warden, Deputy Warden and Assistant Warden.   The live-in senior management team are supported by a group of 10 sub-wardens.  The sub-wardens are Otago senior students who live in the college and provide pastoral welfare and care to the residents as well as assisting with the college's events and activities programmes.   The college also has a team of affiliated staff members who provide maintenance, catering, cleaning service and administration.

Caroline Freeman College offers an extensive programme of social, cultural, sporting and volunteering opportunities both within the college and as a part of the University of Otago Inter-Collegiate events and competitions.

Academic support is provided through an in-house mentoring programme which matches each resident with a senior member of staff, the provision of formal tutorials in key subject areas and the promotion of general study skills and formation of small study groups.  Both East and West campuses are fully integrated into one college and residents have full access to facilities on both sites.

Residents of Caroline Freeman College are collectively known as "Freemanites" or "Carolinians".  In 2019 the college adopted the flamingo as the official mascot.

Heads of College
 Joy Crawford, 2000 - 2014
 Christina Watson-Mills, Jamie Gilbertson, 2015
 Andy Walne, 2016 - 2018
 Chris Addington, 2018–present

External links 
 Caroline Freeman College website
 Otago Residential Colleges

References 

Buildings and structures of the University of Otago